Cindy Yang may refer to:

 Li "Cindy" Yang, Chinese-American massage parlor owner and Trump fundraiser
 Cindy Yang (actress), Taiwanese actress